Suicide is a significant national social issue in the United Kingdom. In 2019 there were 5,691 registered deaths by suicide in England and Wales, equating to an average of 18 suicides per day in the country. Suicide is the single biggest killer of men under the age of 45 in the country.

Governmental and other organisations have created different initiatives to attempt to prevent suicides in the country, including the establishment of a new post, Parliamentary Under Secretary of State (Mental Health, Inequalities and Suicide Prevention).

Definition 
The Office for National Statistics defines suicide as deaths from intentional self-harm (where a coroner has given a suicide conclusion or made it clear in the narrative conclusion that the deceased intended to end their own life) and events of undetermined intent (mainly deaths where a coroner has given an open conclusion) in people aged 15 and over, and also (since 2016) deaths from intentional self-harm in children aged 10 to 14. This definition will include more deaths than the definition used in other countries.

Dynamics 
Researchers and sociologists have identified several causes for the high rate of suicide in the United Kingdom; these include recent recessions, unemployment, austerity measures and loneliness. Research undertaken by Samaritans agree that socio-economic status tends to be the main cause, as it is for other groups. Relationship breakdown is another factor as they are often relying on a female partner for emotional support and are more likely to have access to their children restricted.

Common methods 
The most common method used in England and Wales is hanging, accounting for 59.4% of male and 45% of female suicides. Other suicides reported often include self-poisoning. Suicide using firearms accounts for only a very small fraction, possibly due to tight gun control, meaning very few households in the UK possess them (4 per cent). Hanging is the most common method used by women, closely followed by self poisoning.

Inhalation of domestic gas was the most common method of suicide during the mid-twentieth century. It was completely eliminated by the 1990s as a result of the replacement of coal gas containing toxic carbon monoxide by the non-poisonous natural gas. Later, suicide by inhalation of carbon monoxide from car exhausts became common, but has declined since the introduction of catalytic converters.

Statistics 
Age-standardised rates generally fell between 1981 and 2007, with rates in subsequent years increasing to reach a peak of 11.1 deaths per 100,000 in 2013, though this was still substantially less than the rates seen in the 1980s and 1990s. The highest rate of suicide was recorded as 21.4 deaths per 100,000 population in 1988. Male suicides have consistently accounted for approximately three-quarters of all suicides in the UK since the mid-1990s.

6,507 people died by suicide in 2018, significantly more than in 2017. In January 2013, MPs expressed concern at a rise in the number of suicides over the preceding years.

The suicide rate of 11.2 deaths per 100,000 population recorded by the Office for National Statistics (ONS) in 2018 is an increase on the 10.1 per 100,000 population recorded in 2017, which was the lowest since the organisation began recording data on suicide in the United Kingdom in 1981. In 1981 the ONS recorded the UK suicide rate as 14.7 deaths per 100,000.

In 2019, the 15% increase in the suicide rate in Scotland was described as "devastating," with men most at risk.

Suicide prevention 

Within the UK there are various organisations providing free mental health support.

The National Health Service (NHS) is the main provider of a range of mental health services, including 24/7 mental health crisis lines.

There are also prominent charities providing support via free helplines including Samaritans and Inner Allies (previously named Mind Allies).

The government of the United Kingdom and a number of international and national organizations have undertaken a variety of efforts and initiatives to prevent suicides. There are different associations that provide help and suggestions to suicidal people. Some notable organisations include Grassroots Suicide Prevention (who developed the first UK suicide prevention app - Stay Alive), Papyrus (a suicide prevention group founded in 1997 by Jean Kerr – who lost her son to suicide), Maytree (a sanctuary for the suicidal), and U can cope.

In 2012, the United Kingdom government decided to spend £1.5 million to develop planning and strategies on preventing suicides. In January 2013, the social networking site Facebook started a partnership with suicide-prevention organisation "Save.org" to provide data that will be used to identify warning signs of people at risk of suicide. The service became live in the UK in 2016.

On 10 October 2018, the Prime Minister, Theresa May, announced the UK's first Minister for Suicide Prevention.

Terminology 
There have been calls in the UK to change the language used around the topic of suicide, particularly the use of the phrase "commit suicide". The phrase is seen by some as suggesting suicide is a criminal act, thereby enforcing a notion of legal wrongdoing in the same way as "committing rape" or "committing murder".

The mainstream UK media currently observes the practice of avoiding the phrase "commit suicide" in line with the media reporting guidelines published by suicide prevention charity Samaritans, who refer to it as "inappropriate language".

On 10 September 2018 (World Suicide Prevention Day) more than 130 British celebrities and campaigners called for an end to the phrase "commit suicide", instead preferring the term "die by suicide". The letter was backed by  Samaritans, mental health charity Mind, Members of Parliament from all political parties, London Mayor Sadiq Khan, June Sarpong, Stephen Fry, Zoe Ball and others.

See also 
 Campaign Against Living Miserably, UK charity
 Criminal Justice Act (Northern Ireland) 1966
 Suicide Act 1961
 Suicide legislation

General
 Mental health in the United Kingdom

References

External links
 NHS mental health services
 NHS – Where to get urgent help for mental health
 Campaign Against Living Miserably (CALM)
 Grassroots Suicide Prevention
 Inner Allies
 Mental Health Foundation – suicidal-thoughts
 Mind
 PAPYRUS
 Samaritans
 SOS Silence of Suicide